Theab Majrashi (born 25 March 1983) is a Saudi Arabian footballer who plays as a defender.

Career
He formerly played for Al-Hilal, Al-Najma, Al-Hazem, Al-Taawoun, Al-Riyadh, Sdoos, and Al-Washm.

References

External links
 

1983 births
Living people
Saudi Arabian footballers
Association football defenders
Al Hilal SFC players
Al-Najma SC players
Al-Hazem F.C. players
Al-Riyadh SC players
Al-Taawoun FC players
Sdoos Club players
Al-Washm Club players
Al-Anwar Club players
Saudi Professional League players
Saudi First Division League players
Saudi Second Division players
Saudi Fourth Division players